Pedro Oriona (died 1560) was a Roman Catholic prelate who served as Auxiliary Bishop of Toledo (1549–1560).

Biography
Pedro Oriona was ordained a friar in the Order of the Blessed Virgin Mary of Mercy. On 18 Jan 1549, he was appointed during the papacy of Pope Paul III as Auxiliary Bishop of Toledo and Titular Bishop of Columbica. He served as Auxiliary Bishop of Toledo until his death in 1560.

References 

16th-century Roman Catholic bishops in Spain
1560 deaths
Bishops appointed by Pope Paul III
Mercedarian bishops